Dərvişlər (also, Darvishlyar and Dervishlyar) is a village and municipality in the Sharur District of Nakhchivan Autonomous Republic, Azerbaijan. It is located 5 km in the south from the district center, on the bank of the Arpachay River, on the Sharur plain. Its population is busy with grain-growing, vine-growing, foddering, tobacco-growing and animal husbandry. There are secondary school, library, club and a medical center in the village. It has a population of 568.

Etymology
It is an Ethno-toponymy. The settlement was founded by the settling of the generation of Dervishes in here. Dərvişlər means (Dervishes).

References 

Populated places in Sharur District